Shad Deh, also rendered as Shadeh or Shady, may refer to:
 Bala Shad Deh
 Pain Shad Deh